This is a list of newspapers in Uganda.

List of newspapers

See also
 Media in Uganda
 List of newspapers in Africa
 Communications in Uganda

References

Bibliography

External links
 

 
Uganda
Newspapers